D/Generation is an action-adventure game with puzzle elements developed for the 8-bit Apple II during the late 1980s, but instead published and released for MS-DOS, Amiga, and Atari ST by Mindscape in 1991. The game takes place in a slightly cyberpunk futuristic setting in 2021.

It was ported to the Amiga CD32 in 1993, allowing use of the 6-button CD32 gamepad.

A remake of the game with improved graphics called D/Generation HD was released for Microsoft Windows by West Coast Software on October 23, 2015 and for the Nintendo Switch on March 27, 2018 in North America and on April 3, 2018 in Europe.

Plot
D/Generation plot begins in Singapore on June 26, 2021. A French company called Genoq has developed a series of new genetically engineered bioweapons, which have run out of control and taken over Genoq's Singaporean lab. The main character is a courier making an emergency delivery by jet pack of an important package to one of Genoq's top researchers, Jean-Paul Derrida (a name likely inspired by the philosophers Jean-Paul Sartre and Jacques Derrida), and who is oblivious to the events inside the building until the lab's doors lock behind him after he enters. His point of delivery is ten floors away, all of them crawling with bioweapons.

Gameplay
The game presents an isometric point of view of different interconnected, maze-like rooms that the player passes through floor by floor. Each room can require brains, brawn or both. All bioweapons present in a room must be killed and all air duct vents that they enter through sealed before proceeding further. The building's paranoid security system has predictably gone haywire, leaving rotating grenade launcher turrets, land mines, electrified floors and laser fences targeting humans. Less hostile puzzle elements are doors, the switches and computers that control them, keycards, infrared electric eyes and teleporters.

The courier is soon armed with a laser gun that holds unlimited ammunition and a great puzzle value: its shots bounce off walls, trip switches and travel in teleporters. Finally, surviving Genoq employees and some special items are scattered around the floors. Rescuing a survivor by clearing a room of bioweapons and getting him/her to its entry point in one piece earns an extra life. Bombs are the most prominent item; they can blast through doors and destroy some hazards, making them a kind of a "get out of puzzle free" coupon.

The number of lives is limited. Losing one restarts the room if any are left, the floor if not. Saving is available, loading returns to the start of the floor.

Development
D/Generation was originally developed for the 128K Apple IIe (utilizing Double-Hi-Res mode) under the name D-Generation. An early preliminary version for that platform exists and is dated 1989. According to the Prince of Persia journals by Jordan Mechner, the game was completed in 1990 but the MS-DOS version from 1991 appears to be the first public release. While the original Apple II version was fully playable and well polished, it was never completed nor publicly released.

Reception
Electronic Gaming Monthly gave the Amiga CD32 version a 7.25 out of 10. They criticized that the Amiga CD32 controller does not work well with the game's isometric perspective, but praised the combination of action and puzzles, describing the game as both addictive and challenging.

In 1994, PC Gamer US named D/Generation the 32nd best computer game ever. The editors wrote that its "clever mix of puzzle-solving and arcade action hooked nearly everyone who did get a chance to try it out". That same year, PC Gamer UK named it the 44th best computer game of all time, calling it the "best game of its type on the PC". In 1998, PC Gamer US declared it the 38th best computer game ever released, and the editors wrote that its "gameplay is still as fresh and inviting as the day it was first released".

In 1996, the game was ranked the 40th best game of all time by Amiga Power.

References

External links

1991 video games
Action-adventure games
Amiga 1200 games
Amiga CD32 games
Amiga games
Atari ST games
Cyberpunk video games
DOS games
Mindscape games
Nintendo Switch games
Single-player video games
Video games developed in the United States
Video games scored by Mark Knight
Video games set in 2021
Video games set in Singapore
Video games with isometric graphics
Windows games